Debby Friday is an experimental musician currently based in Toronto.

History
Friday was born in Nigeria, and raised in Montreal. In 2018, she moved from Montreal to Vancouver. Friday released her first EP, Bitchpunk, in 2018. In August of 2019, she released her second EP, Death Drive. The album was named Bandcamp's "Album of the Day". and received a 7.2 from Pitchfork. In January 2023, Friday announced that her debut album, Good Luck, will be released through Sub Pop on March 24, 2023. Alongside the announcement, she released a song titled "So Hard to Tell".

References

External links

Sub Pop artists
21st-century women musicians
Year of birth missing (living people)
Living people